Clumber is a rural locality in the Scenic Rim Region, Queensland, Australia.

Geography 
Clumber has the following mountains, five of them on the Great Dividing Range (from north to south):

 Mount Mathieson
Mount Alphen 
Spicers Peak (also known as Barguggan) 
Cuthbertson Peaks
 Double Top 

Spicers Gap (also known as Calloongpah) is a mountain pass over the Great Dividing Range.; it lie between Mount Alphen and Spicers Peak.

History 
On 23 April 1890, a railway survey party exploring the route to connect the Maryvale railway line with the Mount Edwards railway line to create the Via Recta railway line named Mount Mathieson after John Mathieson, the Queensland Commissioner for Railways.

In 2001, Cuthbertson Peaks were named after Jim Cuthbertson, for his contributions to the Scenic Rim district. He was a member of the Brisbane Bushwalkers Club.

The locality contains 37 households, in which 48.3% of the population are males and 51.7% of the population are females with a median age of 54, 16 years above the national average. The average weekly household income is $1,187, $251 below the national average.

Education 
There are no schools in Clumber. The nearest government primary school is Aratula State School in Aratula to the north-east. The nearest government secondary school is Boonah State High School in Boonah to the north-east.

Attractions 
Governors Chair Lookout is a tourist attraction.

References 

Scenic Rim Region
Localities in Queensland